Rho Pavonis, Latinized from ρ Pavonis, is a single, variable star in the southern constellation of Pavo. It is yellow-white in hue and faintly visible to the naked eye with an apparent visual magnitude that fluctuates around 4.86. The star is located at a distance of approximately 190 light years from the Sun based on parallax, and is drifting further away with a radial velocity of +8 km/s. It is a candidate outlying member of the Tucana Association of co-moving stars.

This is a metallic-line star with a stellar classification of Fm δ Del, where the suffix notation indicating it is a δ Delphini star. It is a Delta Scuti variable, varying in brightness by 0.03 magnitudes. The star has 4.3  times the girth of the Sun and is spinning with a projected rotational velocity of 45 km/s. It is radiating 34 times the luminosity of the Sun from its photosphere at an effective temperature of 6,704 K.

References

F-type giants
Delta Scuti variables
Am stars

Pavo (constellation)
Pavonis, Rho
Durchmusterung objects
195961
101773
7859